Sanghar (English: Sānghar) is a city in Sanghar District, Sindh, Pakistan. Sanghar is the headquarters of Sanghar District and Sanghar Taluka (a subdivision of the district). The driving distance of Sangher from Karachi is 268 kilometers (166 miles). It has road links with Hyderabad, Nawabshah, Mirpur Khas, Khairpur, Sukkur, Karachi and other major cities of Sindh.

The surrounding area consists chiefly of semiarid land, a part of the great Thar Desert, and some cropped areas irrigated by the Mithrao Canal system, which feeds from the Indus River. It is located in an agricultural area where rice, wheat, and cotton are mainly grown, but it is also home to several cotton-textile factories and is a local market town.

Population of the city is 75,209 (2017). This is the third most populous city of Sanghar district after Tando Adam and Shahdadpur.

It is not known when Sanghar was founded. However, it was a small village with a population of few hundred. It is generally believed that Sanghar was named after a pious fisherwoman Mai Sanghar. During the British rule in India, the population of this village increased and it grew in a small town. When Sindh was separated from the Bombay Presidency in 1935, Sanghar earned the title of Taluka. In 1954 it was given the status of District Headquarter.

Educational institutions 
 Shaheed Benazir Bhutto University Shaheed Benazirabad (Sanghar Campus), a public sector institute offering Bachelors in Business Administration, English and Information Technology (4 years programs)
 Bahria Foundation College, Sanghar (a private sector institute offering studies up to Intermediate Science from Nursery level)
 Fauji Foundation School, Sanghar (military - private sector institute offering studies up to Matriculation from Nursery level)
 OPF Schools Sanghar Campus, (a private sector institute offering studies up to Matriculation from Nursery level)

References

External links
 District Government Sanghar

Sanghar District
Talukas of Sindh

simple:Sanghar Tehsil